Wadi Hilweh is a neighborhood in the  Palestinian Arab village of Silwan, intertwined with an Israeli settlement.
The Silwan area of East Jerusalem was annexed by Israel following the 1967 Six-Day War and 1980 Jerusalem Law, an action not recognized internationally. The international community regards Israeli settlements as illegal under international law, although Israel disputes this.

The Wadi Hilweh neighborhood stretches over historical Jerusalem's so-called Southeast Hill,  extending down from the southern city walls of the Old City.

Modern history

Late Ottoman period

The area immediately outside the walls of Jerusalem was undeveloped for most of early modern history, with the exception of the village of Silwan. Modern settlement outside of the walls began in the late 19th century. A few small buildings are visible on the hill facing the houses of Silwan in the Illés Relief, built between 1864 and 1873. In 1873–1874 a member of the notable Jewish Meyuchas family moved to a house on the towards the bottom of the hill. During the early 20th century, Baron de Rothschild acquired some land in the same area for the purposes of archaeological excavation. The Meyuchas family left in the 1930s; no other Jewish families are known to have settled in the area during the period.

Settlement in Mandatory Palestine
During the later stages of the Mandate era the houses of the nearby Arab village of Silwan expanded across the Kidron Valley and up the ridge of what became Wadi Hilweh.

Jordanian period
After the 1948 Arab–Israeli War, the whole area fell on the eastern side of the Green Line under Jordanian control.

Post 1967 and Israeli settlement

Arab families continued to live on the ridge and to build houses there after 1967.

More recently, the Wadi Hilweh neighbourhood has become the scene of both archaeological exploration and Israeli settler activity, becoming embroiled in what archaeologist Rafi Greenberg has called "the Israeli national project of unifying Jerusalem and the settler project of breaking Palestinian Jerusalem apart", both of which have "joined to disenfranchise the people living above and among the antiquities".

Greenberg noted that, as of 2014, the local settlers were "a tiny, belligerent minority in Silwan", while the "indigenous [Palestinian] community are deprived of their materiality", calling it a "classic case of residual colonialism".

In October 2014, Uri Ariel, politician from The Jewish Home party and at that time Israeli Minister of Housing and Construction, caused controversy when he suggested he was considering taking up residence in the area.

Archaeological excavations

From 1968 to 1977 the Israel Exploration Society began the first excavations on the hill that rises to the north of the Wadi Hilweh neighbourhood, believed to be the elevated area known as the ophel of Jerusalem in the Hebrew bible. The work was led by Benjamin Mazar and Eilat Mazar.<ref>Excavations on the South of the Temple Mount. The Ophel of Biblical Jerusalem, Qedem. Monographs of the Institute of Archaeology, The Hebrew University of Jerusalem, No. 29, 1989 ISSN 0333-5844</ref>

 National Parks 

The Jerusalem Walls [National] Park was declared in 1974 on "a large part of the neighborhood of Silwan." Other parks in East Jerusalem include  Tzurim Valley Park in 2000 and in 2013, Mount Scopus Slopes National Park (located between al-'Esawiyah and a-Tur), and Refa’im Stream National Park (on lands belonging to al-Walaja). These parks were approved on privately owned Palestinian lands and in built-up areas or areas bordering the built-up sections of Palestinian neighborhoods and villages. According to B'Tselem these parks are not meant simply to protect nature, landscape and heritage but are also, "perhaps mainly", meant to promote political agendas. By declaring parts of the city as parks entails no development in these areas and serves the political agenda far better than any municipal restrictions on planning and building.

In 1997, management of the City of David within the park was assumed by the Ir David Foundation (commonly known as Elad). First suggested in 1920 for this particular area, the term "City of David" was used officially from the 1970s onward, following the capture of East Jerusalem by Israel, but today the name with its biblical and political connotations is questioned by some in the archaeological academic community. Since El'Ad took over the management of the park in 1997, 'David's City' has essentially become a religious-nationalist battle cry that has transformed the area from an ordinary Palestinian neighbourhood with a few excavation pits, largely unknown to the Israeli public, into a religious settlement and major national biblical monument with hundreds of thousands of visitors a year and an official education site for Israeli school children and soldiers.

Around 70 homes in the Al-Bustan area of Silwan are under threat of demolition. According to Ir Amim plans call for the establishment of a touristic and archeological park (King's Garden) which would extend the City of David southwards to cover the entirety of Al-Bustan and towards the settler enclave in central Silwan (Batan al-Hawa) where the Ateret Cohanim settler organization is active.

After having been run by Elad for three years, management of the Jerusalem Archaeological Park/Davidson Center, south of the Western Wall Plaza, with effect from July 2021, reverted to the government’s Company for the Reconstruction and Development of the Jewish Quarter.

 Development projects 
 
A US$60–66 million project to construct a 1.4 km cable-car running from the First Station compound, passing over the neighborhoods of Abu Tor and the Valley of Hinnom, then through the Mount Zion parking lot and ending at the Kedem visitor center in Silwan/City of David was put on hold following a judgement by the Israeli High Court on 24 February 2021. Since 2019, the court has several times examined petitions against the project, which is closely connected with Elad. Israeli authorities were given until 22 April to provide explanations to the Court on various matters.

Elad is planning the construction of a 16,000 m2 structure on the opposite side of the Wadi Hilweh Street, at the former Givati parking lot, the "Kedem Compound", which was approved in April 2014, a project that was denounced by UNESCO in October 2016.

References
Notes

Citations

Sources

, Chapter 7: The City of David / Silwan''

Further reading

External links

 Invisible Settlements in Jerusalem. Peace Now Settlement Watch.
 Ancient Silwan (Shiloah) {Siloam} in Israel and The City of David
 The Dig Dividing Jerusalem: Ahdaf Soueif writes on Silwan in the Guardian
 10 reasons the “City of David” is not the wholesome tourist site you thought it was
 Underground Jerusalem: The excavation of tunnels, channels, and underground spaces in the Historic Basin. Emek Shaveh.

 
Neighbourhoods of Jerusalem
Archaeological sites in Jerusalem
Siloam
Former populated places in Southwest Asia